Anastasia Hanifah Muliana is an Indonesian and American mechanical engineer whose research concerns the solid mechanics and viscoelasticity of asphalt, laminates, smart materials, and other composite materials. She is a professor of mechanical engineering at Texas A&M University, where she is also Linda & Ralph Schmidt ‘68 Professor, chair for faculty mentoring and success in mechanical engineering, and faculty ombudsman for the college of engineering.

Education and career
Muliana majored in civil engineering at the Bandung Institute of Technology, graduating in 1997. She went to Georgia Tech for graduate study in engineering, and earned a master's degree in civil engineering there in 1999, but switched to structural engineering and mechanics for her 2004 Ph.D.

She joined Texas A&M as an assistant professor mechanical engineering in 2004, and was tenured as an associate professor in 2010. She was named by the university's college of engineering as a TEES Faculty Fellow and Cain Faculty Fellow in 2016, and was appointed as G. Paul Pepper ’54 Professor in 2017.

Recognition
Muliana was a 2006 winner of the National Science Foundation CAREER Award, and a 2008 winner of the Presidential Early Career Award for Scientists and Engineers. She was named an ASME Fellow in 2016.

References

External links

Year of birth missing (living people)
Living people
American mechanical engineers
American women engineers
Indonesian engineers
Indonesian women academics
Bandung Institute of Technology alumni
Georgia Tech alumni
Texas A&M University faculty
Fellows of the American Society of Mechanical Engineers